The Greenwell Store is a historic building now run as a museum by the Kona Historical Society.

History
Henry Nicholas Greenwell (1826–1891) was an English merchant who originally came to Hawaii in 1850. He went back to England in 1867, and returned and married Elizabeth Caroline Hall (1841–1934). They lived in a wooden house, (the foundation is still visible) and had a stone house built that was used as a store since 1870.

Since Greenwell served as Postmaster, the town that grew up around the store was known as Kealakekua, Hawaii, even though the actual traditional land division of that name is further south. The Hawaii Belt Road now runs past the store.

Descendant Norman Leonard Greenwell (1926-1992) and his wife Jean Greenwell (1929–2009) were founders of the Kona Historical society in 1976. 
On May 22, 1978, the store was added to the National Register of Historic Places listings on the island of Hawaii as site 78001017.  The society restored the former store  to its appearance circa 1875, and opened it as a museum.
The store was added as site 10-37-7243 to the state of Hawaii registry of historic places on August 17, 1991.
Another nearby Greenwell property, the Kona Coffee Living History Farm, is also open for tours by the society.

References

External links

Greenwell family tree

Houses on the National Register of Historic Places in Hawaii
Houses completed in 1870
Buildings and structures in Hawaii County, Hawaii
Agriculture in Hawaii
Living museums in Hawaii
Museums in Hawaii County, Hawaii
Retail buildings in Hawaii
1870 establishments in Hawaii
Rural history museums in Hawaii
Houses in Hawaii County, Hawaii
National Register of Historic Places in Hawaii County, Hawaii
Commercial buildings on the National Register of Historic Places in Hawaii
Commercial buildings completed in 1870